The Daikyo Palm Meadows Cup was a golf tournament held in Australia from 1988 to 1992 at the Palm Meadows Golf Course, Carrara, Queensland. Prize money was A$500,000 in 1988, A$600,000 in 1989, A$800,000 in 1990, A$1,200,000 in 1991 and A$1,400,000 in 1992.

Winners

References

Former PGA Tour of Australasia events
Golf tournaments in Australia
Golf in Queensland
Recurring sporting events established in 1988
Recurring events disestablished in 1992